West Noble High School is a public high school located in [[Ligonier, Indiana]].

See also
 List of high schools in Indiana
West Noble is referred to as the Chargers.

References

External links
 Official Website

Buildings and structures in Noble County, Indiana
Public high schools in Indiana
Schools in Noble County, Indiana